This is a list of  bisexual people, specifically notable people who identify as bisexual and deceased people who have been identified as bisexual.

The list is divided into the following sections:

List of bisexual people (A–F)
List of bisexual people (G–M)
List of bisexual people (N–S)
List of bisexual people (T–Z)

 
Lists of LGBT-related people